Muntaner may refer to:

Muntaner (surname)
Muntaner (Barcelona–Vallès Line)
Chronicle of Muntaner